Pleurotomella insignifica is an extinct species of sea snail, a marine gastropod mollusk in the family Raphitomidae.

Description
(Original description)  The fusiform shell shows prominent revolving lines below the middle  of the whorl. The spire is elevated. The shell contains about five angular whorls. The siphonal canal is  short, obliquely curved. The aperture is contracted.

Distribution
Fossils of this marine species were found in Eocene strata in Alabama, USA.

References

insignifica
Gastropods described in 1879